Šeduva is a city in the Radviliškis district municipality, Lithuania.

Šeduva was an agricultural town dealing in  cereals, flax and linseed, pigs and geese and horses, at the site of a royal estate and beside a road from Kaunas to Riga.   The population from the fifteenth century was Catholic and Jewish. Until then, Lithuania had been the last pagan kingdom in Europe and allowed freedom of worship and toleration of Jews and other religions. The first Catholic shrine of Šeduva, the Church of the Invention of the Holy Cross, was built and the parish founded between 1512 and 1529.  The present brick church Cross was built in Šeduva in 1643 with a donation from bishop Jurgis Tiškevičius of Vilnius. During the 18th century the bell tower was added to the structure, with further renovations and extensions in 1905.  Baroque and renaissance architectural styles characterise both the exterior and interior of the church. It has a cruciform plan with an apse, low sacristy and five altars.

During the 15th century the region was redefined as the Voivodeship of Trakai and Vilnius. Later it became part of  the Grand Duchy of Lithuania until the Union of Lublin in 1569 created the Polish-Lithuanian Commonwealth.

The Šeduva coat of arms were granted on June 25, 1654 by John II Casimir Vasa, King of Poland and Grand Duke of Lithuania and at the same time the city was granted burger rights at the request of Maria Ludvika, Queen of Poland. She descended from the Princes of Gonzaga, from Mantua in Italy. The arms of the family showed a black eagle. The small breastshield shows the French fleur-de-lis, because the Gonzaga family was related to the French Royal family.  The eagle was made white in reference to the white eagle of Poland.

1792 Stanislaw II August Poniatowski, the last royal proprietor of Šeduva, concluded an agreement with the town's citizens, giving them rights to be excused from labour on the estate for a fee.  In 1795, the year of a terrible fire in Šeduva,  Lithuania became part of Russia when Poland was partitioned.  From 1798, Baron Theodore von Ropp did not acknowledge the rights of Šeduva citizens and required of the citizens to perform labour in the town's manor. The citizens  petitioned for their rights  to the Russian Senate. In 1812, the Senate passed the decision to recognise the former charters of Šeduva.

Between 1696 and 1762, a Jesuit mission, connected with their college at Pašiaušė, was active in the town, operating a lower school with 96 pupils up until 1828.  After an insurrection in 1863 (the January Uprising), all parish schools in Šeduva were closed and replaced by public Russian language schools. In the same year a Russian Orthodox Church, designed by the architect Ustinas Golinevicius, was built and in 1866 a wooden Synagogue was added near the central market square.

The Molotov-Ribbentrop Pact between Nazi Germany and Communist Russia  in August 1939 and the German-Soviet Boundary and Friendship Treaty a month later placed Lithuania under  Soviet control.   By June 1940 the Soviets had set up a pro-Soviet government and stationed many Red Army troops in Lithuania as part of the Mutual Assistance Pact between the countries. President Antanas Smetona was forced to leave as 15 Red Army divisions came in.

The  pro-Soviet puppet government was controlled by Vladimir Dekanozov and Justas Paleckis, and Lithuania was made part of the  Soviet Union. A Sovietisation programme began immediately. Land, banks and large businesses were nationalised. All religious, cultural, and political organizations were abolished except the Communist party. 17,000 people  were deported to Siberia, where many would perish.

During the years of Lithuanian anti-Soviet partisan resistance (1944–1953) in Šeduva and neighbouring districts Lithuanian Žalioji rinktinė (The Green Squad), belonging to partisans' Algimantas military district was active.

Industry

Šeduva is famous for sheep farming, Lithuanian Black-headed sheep are grown. The state enterprise Šeduvos avininkystė is responsible for the preservation of the genetic stock of Lithuanian Black-Headed sheep.

Culture

The Lost Shtetl Museum
The Lost Shtetl Museum – a privately funded museum of the history of Jewish towns (shtetls) that is going to open in 2023, located in Šeduva. Its aim is to tell the history of the Jews of Šeduva before the Second World War and to present the traditions, businesses and cultural phenomena that are characteristic of other Lithuanian shtetls of that time.
With the estimated floor space of 2.7 thousand square meters, the museum‘s building is designed by Finnish architect Rainer Mahlamäki while the interior of permanent exhibition is overseen by the Ralph Appelbaum Associates.

The Holocaust in Shadeve

The German army invaded Lithuania on 22 June 1941, taking Shadova - Šeduva a few days later as part of Operation Barbarossa. At first the Lithuanian population considered the Nazis to be liberators saving them from the Red Army. Five hundred years of Jewish life in Shadova - Šeduva ended in just two days of slaughter.  Shadova's Jews attempted to flee east to Russia but were badly treated by Lithuanian nationalists and most returned to their homes. The German forces entered Shadova - Šeduva on 25 June 1941 and were received with flowers by many locals.  By the beginning of July, Jews had to wear the yellow Star of David.  Jews who had participated in the  Soviet  rule were immediately arrested and executed.   Jews  were taken to dismantle the remnants of the munitions factory in Linkaičiai, and were then accused of stealing and  executed. Others were forced into labour gangs.  They were set to work cleaning the streets and at the warehouses of the rail station.  All the work was guarded  by armed Lithuanian militia. Next all the Jews of Shadova - Šeduva had to gather in the market place with no more than a small package each, and to hand over the keys to their houses to the police. Under guard, they were escorted at night to the village of Pavartyčiai, five kilometres north-west of Shadova - Šeduva, where they were crowded into two unfinished Soviet barracks surrounded with barbed wire.  The Jews were ordered to hand over all their valuables and cash.  Some were shot in the next few days.

On 25 August 1941 the remaining Jews of Shadova - Šeduva were loaded on trucks and taken to Liaudiškiai, ten kilometres south-west of the town where the Rollcommando Hamann of Einsatzcommando 3 and Lithuanian collaborators of  the 3rd company of the Tautinio Darbo Apsaugos Batalionas were waiting for them.  Over the coming two days the entire Jewish community of Shadova was shot and buried in two pre-prepared mass graves.  One site was located 400 meters north of the Shadova - Šeduva road and a second 900 meters north west of the same road, close to a path in the forest. The lists of mass graves in the book The Popular Massacres of Lithuania, Part II, include the following: Liaudiskiai forest about 10 km southwest of Šeduva, one site 400 meters north of the Šeduva road and a second site 900 meters northwest of the same road, close to a path in the forest. The Jäger report concludes that Einsatzcommando 3 registered the murder in Šeduva on the 25 and 26 August 1941 of 230 Jewish men, 275 Jewish women and 159 Jewish children, a total of 664 people.

To remember the lost community, in 2013-2015, Šeduva Jewish Memorial Fund, restored the old Šeduva Jewish cemetery, properly marked killing sites around the town and erected memorials in each site.

References

External links

 The murder of the Jews of Šeduva during World War II, at Yad Vashem website.

 
Cities in Lithuania
Cities in Šiauliai County
Trakai Voivodeship
Shavelsky Uyezd
Holocaust locations in Lithuania
Radviliškis District Municipality